The Best of Toshiko Akiyoshi is a compilation album of songs taken from BMG Japan releases of the Toshiko Akiyoshi – Lew Tabackin Big Band and the Toshiko Akiyoshi Jazz Orchestra featuring Lew Tabackin.

Track listing
All songs orchestrated by Toshiko Akiyoshi.  All songs composed by Akiyoshi except "Tanuki's Night Out" (Lew Tabackin)

 "Long Yellow Road"
 "Kogun"
 "Elegy"
 "Quadrille, Anyone?"
 "Children in the Temple Ground"
 "Sumi-e"
 "Tanuki's Night Out"
 "Chasing After Love"
 "Duke for the Ages"

References
BMG Japan (Novus-J) BVCJ-37299

Toshiko Akiyoshi – Lew Tabackin Big Band albums
2002 greatest hits albums